Deutsche Lufthansa (abbreviated DLH) was an airline serving as the flag carrier of East Germany from 1955 to 1963. 

Because of the usage of the Lufthansa branding (the trademark rights were owned by West German Lufthansa) the East German company was under constant legal pressure, and was subsequently liquidated and replaced by Interflug.

History
On 27 April 1955, East Germany and the Soviet Union signed an agreement by which Berlin Schönefeld Airport was transferred to civilian use (since 1945, it had been operated by the Soviet Army, with scheduled passenger flights having been operated by Aeroflot). As a consequence, the Council of Ministers of the GDR decided to set up a national East German airline, a move which was finalized on 1 July with the appointment of the company's initial management committee. Deutsche Lufthansa was chosen as name for the airline (previously, it had been used by Deutsche Luft Hansa, the German flag carrier from 1926 to 1945), even though the branding rights had been purchased by West German Lufthansa in 1954.

Deutsche Lufthansa acquired  a fleet of Ilyushin Il-14 aircraft, which were initially operated by Soviet crews. The first flight of the airline took place on 16 September 1955, by which East German prime minister Otto Grotewohl travelled to Moscow for a state visit. Scheduled passenger flights were launched on 4 February 1956 with the inauguration of the East Berlin-Warsaw service. In the same year, the route network was expanded to include Moscow and Sofia as its most remote points. On 28 March 1960, the Ilyushin Il-18 (a turboprop airliner) was put into service with Deutsche Lufthansa.

Because of the usage of the Lufthansa branding, the company was sued by West German Lufthansa. As a side effect, the East German airline was prevented from being admitted into the International Air Transport Association (it could not become a member of the International Civil Aviation Organization either, because at that time neither East nor West Germany had been accepted into the United Nations). As a consequence, Deutsche Lufthansa was liquidated on 1 September 1963. Its staff, fleet and route network were transferred to Interflug, which had been founded as a state-owned charter airline in 1958 and served as East German flag carrier thenceforth.

Route network

Deutsche Lufthansa served the following destinations on a scheduled basis. As airline code for its flight numbers, DH was used.

References

Citations

Bibliography
 Klaus Breiler: Das große Buch der Interflug. Das Neue, Berlin 2007, .
 Helmut Erfurth: Das große Buch der DDR-Luftfahrt. GeraMond, München 2004, .

Airlines of East Germany
Airlines established in 1955
Airlines disestablished in 1963
1955 establishments in East Germany
East Berlin